Bevere may refer to:

Bevere, Belgium, a town near Oudenaarde, Belgium
Bevere, Worcestershire, a hamlet in Worcestershire, England